La Remuée is a commune in the Seine-Maritime department in the Normandy region in northern France.

Geography

Heraldry

Population

Places of interest
 The church of St. Thomas, dating from the nineteenth century.
 Notre-Dame church, dating from the thirteenth century.
 The chateau de Marefosse.

See also
Communes of the Seine-Maritime department

References

External links

 Official website of the commune 
 Printemps de La Remuée road run, the premier race in the département 

Communes of Seine-Maritime